Sekondi-Takoradi is a city in Ghana comprising the twin cities of Sekondi and Takoradi. It is the capital of Sekondi – Takoradi Metropolitan Assembly and the Western Region of Ghana. Sekondi-Takoradi is the region’s and largest Fante city as well as an industrial and commercial center, with a population of 445,205 people (2012).
The chief industries in Sekondi-Takoradi are timber, cocoa processing, plywood, shipbuilding, its harbour and railway repair, and recently, sweet crude oil and crude oil. The fundamental job in Sekondi-Takoradi is fishing. Sekondi-Takoradi lies on the main railway lines to Kumasi and Accra. It is one of the most modern and cleanest cities in Ghana.

History
 
Sekondi, an older and larger Ahanta town, was the site of Dutch Fort Orange (1642) and English Fort Sekondi (1682). It prospered from a railroad built in 1903 to hinterland mineral and timber resources. Takoradi, also an Ahanta town, was the site of Dutch Fort Witsen (1665) and has an important deepwater seaport, Ghana's first, built in 1928.

During World War II, RAF Takoradi was an important staging point for British aircraft destined for Egypt. Spitfire fighter planes were shipped in crates from England to Takoradi where they were assembled then flown via Nigeria and Sudan to the war in Libya. 26 Squadron SAAF was also based in Takoradi during World War II, flying anti-submarine and convoy protection patrols over the Atlantic. A number of South African airmen are buried in the Takoradi European Public cemetery.

The cities combined in 1946. On 20 November 1969, the city became the seat of the Roman Catholic Diocese of Sekondi–Takoradi.

The city is currently named (although not officially) as the Oil City of Ghana due to the massive discovery of oil in the Western region and has attracted massive migration from people all around the world. For example, of the 248,680 people in the Sekondi-Takoradi metro area in 2010, some 148,000, or well above half, were indigenous Ahanta people, 30,000 came from the central region of Ghana, 60,000 are from other regions of Ghana and 10,000 are foreign nationals.

Demographics
Sekondi-Takoradi's population is overwhelmingly Christian. 35% of the region are Pentecostal/Charismatic, 26% are Protestant and 14% are Catholic with the remaining 12% comprising numerous minor denominations. 9% of the population are Muslim, 3.5% identify as non-religious and 0.2% practice traditional African religions The major ethnic group found in Sekondi are the Ahanta people.

Economy
	 
Takoradi houses the Harbour and has timber, energy and technology industries. Over the years it has attracted a good number of investors, including miners, as the city is close to the mining towns in the western part of Ghana. Ghana's recent discovery of oil gave the Sekondi-Takoradi township to be known as the Oil City.

Transportation
There are public transport connections from Takoradi to major cities such as Accra; Kumasi; Mim; Cape Coast; Sunyani; Tamale; Tema; Ho; Wa; Bolgatanga; Elubo; Aflao; and Techiman.

Tourist attractions
Sekondi-Takoradi has plenty of beaches, however they are not a major tourist attraction. Many of the beaches are found to the west of Takoradi, with small resorts such as Fanta's Folly, The Hideout, and Green Turtle Lodge with larger ones such as Busua Beach, Lou Moon Lodge and Axim Beach Resort and also amazing places to eat such as Scoops Bar, Paragon Bar and Grill.  It also has an annual street carnival, which is popular with tourists. There is also the village of Nzulezu (village on water) which is a popular tourist site, in the Western Region.

Education
Sekondi-Takoradi city has several secondary schools, colleges, and special schools, ranging from single-sex to coeducational institutions. Among the tertiary institutions are: Takoradi Technical University (a public institution), Nurses and Midwifery Training College, Holy Child Teachers Training College (now a College of Education). The Sekondi-Takoradi city currently has several secondary schools and Special schools, ranging from single-sex to coeducational institutions. These include:
 St. John's School (The Saints)

 Ghana Senior High Technical School (GSTS)
 Baidoo Bonsoe Senior High Technical School (BBSTS)
 St Mary's Boys Senior High School 
 Takoradi Secondary School (Tadisco)
 Methodist senior high school ( The Young legend)
 Sekondi College (Sekco)
 Ahantaman Senior High School
 Fijai Secondary School
 Adiembra Secondary School
 Bompeh senior high technical school 
 Archbishop Porter Girls Secondary School and many others.
	 
Takoradi Technical Institute houses a fab lab, equipped by the Massachusetts Institute of Technology (MIT), which is the first of its kind in Africa.
 
Takoradi has a well-equipped technical training center (Takoradi Technical Institute, TTI, 1,400 students in two shifts) assisted by the German government through GTZ/GOPA. Apart from TTI, Takoradi has a polytechnic and other renowned secondary schools including Ghana Secondary Technical School, St. Mary Secondary School, Bompeh Secondary School, Takoradi Secondary School and many others. Sekondi-Takoradi has many internet cafés and computer training centers to encourage familiarity with computers and acquire computer skills.

The Western Regional Library was established in Sekondi in 1955.

Stadiums and sports

Stadiums
Essipong Stadium
Gyandu Park

Sports
Professional sports teams based in Sekondi-Takoradi include:	 
 FC Takoradi	 
 Sekondi Hasaacas	 
 Sekondi Wise Fighters

Institutions 

 Empire FM

Climate 
Sekondi-Takoradi has a tropical savanna climate (Köppen climate classification: Aw).

Sister cities 
 Palermo, Italy (2021)
 Boston, United States (2001)
 Oakland, United States (1975)

Gallery

See also
 Takoradi Airport
 Takoradi Harbour	 
 Market Circle, Takoradi
 Railway stations in Ghana

References

Afrosages.com, Tourist Destinations Of Western Ghana, January 13, 2020

Wildcat Beauty, Cosmetics & More, Market Circle (behind Bank of Africa (Takoradi, Ghana

External links
Mytakoradi.com
 Ghana-pedia webpage – Takoradi	

 
Populated places in the Western Region (Ghana)
Regional capitals in Ghana